Etretinate (trade name Tegison) is a medication developed by Hoffmann–La Roche that was approved by the FDA in 1986 to treat severe psoriasis. It is a second-generation retinoid. It was subsequently removed from the Canadian market in 1996 and the United States market in 1998 due to the high risk of birth defects. It remains on the market in Japan as Tigason.

Pharmacology
Etretinate is a highly lipophilic, aromatic retinoid. It is stored and released from adipose tissue, so its effects can continue long after dosage stops. It is detectable in the plasma for up to three years following therapy. Etretinate has a low therapeutic index and a long elimination half-life (t1/2) of 120 days, which make dosing difficult.

Etretinate has been replaced by acitretin, the free acid (without the ethyl ester). While acitretin is less lipophilic and has a half-life of only 50 hours, it is partly metabolized to etretinate in the body, so that it is still a long-acting teratogen and pregnancy is prohibited for two years after therapy.

Precautions
Etretinate is a teratogen, and may cause birth defects long after use. Therefore, birth control is advised during therapy, and for at least three years after therapy has stopped.
Etretinate should be avoided in children, as it may interfere with bone growth.
If a patient has ever taken etretinate, he or she is not eligible to donate blood in the United States, the United Kingdom, or Québec, due to the risk of birth defects. In Japan, people may not donate blood for two years after ceasing to use the medication.

Side effects
Side effects are those typical of hypervitaminosis A, most commonly
 bone or joint pain, stiffness; in long-term treatment diffuse idiopathic skeletal hyperostosis
 muscular or abdominal cramps
 dry, burning, itching eyelids
 unusual bruising

History
The drug was approved by the FDA in 1986 to treat severe psoriasis. It was subsequently removed from the Canadian market in 1996 and the United States market in 1998 due to the high risk of birth defects.

In Japan, the drug remains on market branded Tigason.

See also 
 Isotretinoin
 List of withdrawn drugs

References 

Retinoids
Withdrawn drugs
Ethyl esters
Phenol ethers
Polyenes